The M2 is a motorway in Kent, England. It feeds into the A2, forming a 62 mile long trunk road from London to (almost) Dover.

Route
The M2 starts west of Strood, Kent at Three Crutches, diverging southeastwards from the A2 road that heads ESE from Central London, one of five roads of dual carriageway width or greater reaching into the southern half of Greater London. From junction 1 it has four lanes each way that slope into the Medway Valley south of Rochester. On the west bank of the River Medway is junction 2 intersecting the A228 between Strood and West Malling, a junction where the master exit roundabout passes under the HS1 track and which retains, by footbridge and tunnel, the North Downs Way (a public footpath).

By this point the road is mounted on the Medway Viaduct, passing over the Medway Valley railway and the river.  On the east (right) bank are Wouldham marshes, south, and north are the elevated suburbs of the three conjoined Medway Towns including Borstal, a village nationally synonymous with its prototype 1902-founded Young Offenders' Institution.

The M2 ascends a steep stream valley to Blue Bell Hill (under which HS1 runs in a tunnel) using split-levels to reach junction 3 (for Medway Towns and Maidstone) by Walderslade. It takes the north of the escarpment of the North Downs becoming a conventional three lanes, and runs northeast across Cossington Fields, Westfield Sole, Lidsing, and Bredhurst towards junction 4 where the road becomes two lanes to junction 7.

Continuing east, passing Medway Service area, it crosses the A249 over the Stockbury Viaduct at junction 5 (for Sheerness and Maidstone East).  It then takes the unusually gentle coastal lower slopes of the North Downs, below which  before its end, is Faversham north of junction 6. It ends at junction 7, allowing traffic to continue on either of two dual carriageways: the A299 for six coastal towns including four on Thanet or the upgraded A2 towards Canterbury and Dover as far as Lydden,  from the edge of Dover which then mainly reduces to one operational lane each way.

History

Original construction

The initial section of the motorway (junctions 2 to 5) was opened by the then Transport Minister Ernest Marples on 29 May 1963, with the remainder being constructed in 1965. It was opened in three stages:
Junctions 1 to 2 in 1965
Junctions 2 to 5 in 1963
Junctions 5 to 7 in 1965

It was planned to extend the M2 to London and Dover, making it the main route between London and the channel ports, but this extension never materialised due to a lack of traffic demand. Instead the A2 was dualled and improved from Brenley Corner to Dover.

The M2 was originally to be designated as the A2(M), but as a result of the Daily Telegraph reporting it as the M2, the Ministry of Transport adopted this, and later decided upon the M20 designation for the main London-Channel Ports link.

Junction amendments
Aside from retrofitting central crash barriers, like all early motorways, the alignment of the M2 did not significantly change until the late 1990s. Traffic using it decreased when the M20 was completed from London to Folkestone in May 1991, while the M2 continued to Canterbury and the North Kent ports of Sheerness and Ramsgate. Junction 1 was altered when the A289 Wainscott Northern bypass was built in the late 1990s.

Widening
The M2 was still busy between junctions 1 and 4, and suffered from HGVs blocking the outside lane. In 2000, work began on widening the M2 from two lanes to four lanes. A joint venture between Costain, Skanska and Mowlem (CSM) created the company that would undertake the project. The project required the redesign of junction 2 and junction 3, and a second Medway Bridge. The existing bridge was converted to a four lane eastbound carriageway (including a hard shoulder). The new bridge formed the westbound carriageway. The entire stretch was lit with streetlights (the old section was not lit). The old Medway Bridge was physically narrowed by removing part of the footpath. High-pressure water cutting equipment was used to cut the concrete into manageable sections for disposal. There is only one path open to the public now.

Spoil from the North Downs Tunnel was used to form the new embankment for the London bound traffic between junction 2 and the Nashenden Valley.

The widening was completed in July 2003.

Service area
The M2 opened with a single service area between junctions 4 and 5, named Farthing Corner Services and operated by Top Rank. Today the services are known as Medway services and are operated under the Moto brand with a Travelodge hotel.

The services have an access road to the local network for service and delivery vehicles that is not, like some motorway service areas, restricted with a gate or barrier. This has led to local businesses using the services as an unofficial exit from the motorway.

Junctions

{| style="margin-left:1em; margin-bottom:1em; color:black; font-size:95%;" class="wikitable"
|-  style="background:#0080d0; text-align:center; color:white; font-size:120%;"
| colspan="6" | M2 motorway junctions
|-
!scope=col|miles
!scope=col|km
!scope=col abbr="Westbound"|Westbound exits (B carriageway)
!scope=col|Junction
!scope=col abbr="Eastbound"|Eastbound exits (A carriageway)
!scope=col|Coordinates
|- style="text-align:center;"
|rowspan="2"| 27.0  27.5
|rowspan="2"| 43.4  44.3
| Road continues as A2 to London
| J1
| Rochester A2Gillingham, Grain A289 Non-motorway traffic
| rowspan="2"|
|- style="text-align:center;"
|  Grain, Rochester A289
| J1A
| Start of motorway 
|-
|- style="text-align:center;"
|28.8 29.0
|46.3 46.6
| Strood/Rochester, West Malling A228
| J2
| Strood/Rochester, West Malling A228
| 
|- style="text-align:center;"
|32.6  32.8
|52.4  52.8
| Maidstone, Chatham, Rochester A229Chatham B12(A)
| J3
| Maidstone, Chatham A229Channel Tunnel (M20)
| 
|- style="text-align:center;"
|36.4  36.5
|58.5  58.8
| Gillingham A278
| J4
| Gillingham A278
| 
|- style="text-align:center;"
|
|
|Medway Services
|Services
|Medway Services
| 
|- style="text-align:center;"
|40.0  40.3
|64.4  64.9
| Maidstone, Sheerness A249 The WEST, Gatwick Airport (M20)
| J5
| Maidstone, Sittingbourne, Sheerness A249
| 
|- style="text-align:center;"
|50.6  50.8
|81.5  81.8
| Faversham, Ashford A251
| J6
| Faversham, Ashford A251
| 
|- style="text-align:center;"
|rowspan="2"| 52.3  52.6
|rowspan="2"| 84.2  84.7
| Start of motorway
| rowspan="2"|J7
| Canterbury, Dover, Channel Tunnel A2
| rowspan="2"|
|- style="text-align:center;"
| Canterbury, Channel Tunnel, Dover, Faversham A2 Non-motorway traffic
| Road continues as A299 (Thanet Way) to Ramsgate
|-
|colspan=6|Notes
Distances in kilometres and carriageway identifiers are obtained from driver location signs/location marker posts. Where a junction spans several hundred metres and the data is available, both the start and finish values for the junction are shown.
Coordinate data from ACME Mapper.
|-

See also
List of motorways in the United Kingdom

References

External links

CBRD
Motorway Database – M2
Media – Photos Of the Medway Viaduct Under Construction
Histories – Opening Booklets, including M2
Photographs of the Medway Viaduct From Its Public Footpath
The Motorway Archive – M2

Motorways in England
Roads in Kent